John William Coutts (born 14 August 1956) is a former New Zealand swimmer. Now based in Australia, he is the co-owner of Carlile Swimming Australia, the world's largest private swimming organisation founded by Forbes Carlile.

Coutts was born in Marton in 1955, and grew up in Hastings. He received his education at Hastings Central, Hastings Intermediate, and Hastings Boys' High Schools. Coutts was the first person to swim Cook Strait in both directions.

Coutts won a bronze medal in the 200 m butterfly at the 1974 British Commonwealth Games in Christchurch, New Zealand. He competed at the 1975 World Aquatics Championships in Cali, Colombia. He represented New Zealand at the 1976 Summer Olympics and came sixteenth and eighteenth in 100 m butterfly and 200 m butterfly, respectively.

Coutts owns and is director of Carlile Swimming Australia, the largest private swimming school in the world, originally set up by Australian swimming legend Forbes Carlile and his wife Ursula Carlile. Coutts is also co-owner of a swimming school in the United States.

At age 16, he was voted Hawke's Bay Sportsperson of the Year in 1972. In June 2012, he was inducted into the Hawke's Bay's Sports Hall of Fame. He is married to Sally, and they have four children. Coutts and his wife live in Australia.

References

1955 births
Living people
People from Marton, New Zealand
People educated at Hastings Boys' High School
Swimmers at the 1974 British Commonwealth Games
Swimmers at the 1976 Summer Olympics
Commonwealth Games bronze medallists for New Zealand
Olympic swimmers of New Zealand
New Zealand long-distance swimmers
Cook Strait swimmers
Commonwealth Games medallists in swimming
New Zealand male butterfly swimmers
Medallists at the 1974 British Commonwealth Games